Paramathi Velur, a town in Paramathi-Velur taluk, Namakkal District, Tamil Nadu, India is situated just off the Srinagar - Kanyakumari National Highway 44 (India). This  town is also called as Paramathi Velur, with STD Code  04268 & Postal code 638182.

Paramathi Velur is also a state assembly constituency in Tamil Nadu, India. It was formed after constituency delimitations in 2008[1] and forms a part of the Namakkal parliamentary constituency.

Geography

It has an average elevation of 170 metres (566 feet).

History

Historic Kaveri Bridge, which connects the Namakkal and Karur districts, is the popular landmark of the town. This bridge was constructed after much wrangling between the stalwarts of Mohanur and Velur on the best location. Finally the bridge on Cauvery River was built at Velur. The bridge was opened for traffic in 1952. Now another bridge was also constructed adjacent to the old one, The longest road in INDIA is NH-44 which also passes through Paramathi Velur.

Demographics
 India census, Velur had a population of 25,012. Males constitute 49% of the population and females 51%. Velur has an average literacy rate of 74%, equal to national average, male literacy is 80%, and female literacy is 69%. In Velur, 9% of the population is under 6 years of age. The total area of Paramathi-Velur is 525.35 sq.km with population density of 406 per sq.km.

Out of total population, 11,804 were engaged in work or business activity. Of this 7,709 were males while 4,095 were females. In census survey, worker is defined as person who does business, job, service, and cultivator and labour activity. Of total 11804 working population, 90.07% were engaged in Main Work while 9.93% of total workers were engaged in Marginal Work.

Location
Paramathi Velur is located at the bank of River Cauvery. Tamil & English also the primary languages used here. National Highway 44 runs through this town.

Agriculture and food 

The main crops cultivated here are Sugarcane, Coconut, Banana, Cyperus, Yam, Tapioca, Betel, and Tomato. Agriculture is the major occupation of the people. Paddy, sugarcane, banana, coconut trees, turmeric, jute and the Beetle Vine plantation are major crops cultivated.

A village called Pillikalpalayam which has Tamil Nadu's second largest Jaggery (Vellam, a sweet prepared from sugarcane juice) godown. The town is known for its Karpoora Pan leaf, which is exported to major states in North India.

A special fluffy bread called Bun Parotta is one of the most relished food served in the hotels of this area. Non-vegetarians would love to try the special duck curry, which is known for its flavor and taste, and is mostly served in the hotels of this area.

Festivals

The Velur town is adorned with a few ancient temples such as the Kasi Viswanathar Temple, Mariaman Temples, Bhagavathi amman temple. The temple festivals are celebrated with vigor. The ceremonies are spread over a fortnight that always ends with a massive dose of feasting and Keda Vettu.

Adi 18th, is celebrated at the Cauvery river bank with the release of Agal vilakku into the river. This event is watched over by a lot of people at sunset on Adi 18th.

Including Panchayat areas
Paramathi Velur Taluk Total 5 panchayat. Velur, Paramathi, Pothanur, Pandamangalam And Vengarai.

Sub Regional Transport Office
Paramathi Velur has a Motor Vehicle Inspectors office under Namakkal (South) RTO (TN-88). It has code TN-88Z.

Vehicles registered under TN-28-AY, TN-28-AW, TN-28-AU, TN-88-Z, TN-88-Y, TN-88-X, TN-88-W, TN-88-V, TN-88-U series belongs to this RTO Office.

Politics 
It is a part of the Paramathi-Velur (state assembly constituency). S Sekar from AIADMK is the MLA after winning the 2021 Tamil Nadu Legislative Assembly election. M LAKSHMI MOORTHI from DMK is Velur President After Winning in Town Panchayat election 2022.

Educational Institutions

 Kandasamy Kandar Arts & Science college
 Kandasamy Kandar Boys Higher Secondary School
 Kandasamy Kandar Girls Higher Secondary School
 Kandasamy Kandar Matriculation Higher Secondary School
 Kongu Matriculation Higher Secondary School
 KS Maniam Educational Institutions
 Paundamangalam vivekandha matriculation higher secondary school
 RN Oxford school
 Malar school

Transport 

 By bus: There are many private, government buses operated from Salem, Namakkal, Tiruchengode, Erode, Karur, Dindigul, Madurai, which will connect people for 24 Hrs.
 From Chennai there are many private bus travels are available, Example: MGM Travels, Royal Travels, Vivegam Travels, SRM Travels, Rajam Travels, City Travels, Thunaivan Travels, National Travels, SRT Travels with Volvo AC Sleeper Buses Day and Night, KPN Travels, Poojaa Travels to reach Velur.
 By train: Near by towns Pugalur, Namakkal, Karur, Mohanur Having Railway Station which is well connected to Erode, Coimbatore, Trichy, Chennai and Cochin. Both passenger trains and express trains pass through these stations. The most favored train from Chennai is Egmore to Mangalore express where one has to get down at Pugalur, 5 km from Velur.
For passengers leaving from Central station, Palani express is their best choice despite its too early arrival. They can get down at Mohanur, 15 km from Paramathi Velur.

 By air: The nearest airport is in Salem (92 km) and Trichy (111 km). Major Airport is located at Coimbatore (124 km).

References

2011 Census Data  - Velur List Of MLA's in Tamil Nadu 

Cities and towns in Namakkal district
Taluks of Namakkal district